In mathematics, the lines of a 3-dimensional projective space, S, can be viewed as points of a 5-dimensional projective space, T. In that 5-space, the points that represent each line in S lie on a quadric, Q known as the Klein quadric.

If the underlying vector space of S is the 4-dimensional vector space V, then T has as the underlying vector space the 6-dimensional exterior square Λ2V of V. The line coordinates obtained this way are known as Plücker coordinates.

These Plücker coordinates satisfy the quadratic relation 
  
defining Q, where 
  
are the coordinates of the line spanned by the two vectors u and v.

The 3-space, S, can be reconstructed again from the quadric, Q: the planes contained in Q fall into two equivalence classes, where planes in the same class meet in a point, and planes in different classes meet in a line or in the empty set. The geometry of S is retrieved as follows:

 The points of S are the planes in C.
 The lines of S are the points of Q.
 The planes of S are the planes in C’.

The fact that the geometries of S and Q are isomorphic can be explained by the isomorphism of the Dynkin diagrams A3 and D3.

References
 Albrecht Beutelspacher & Ute Rosenbaum (1998) Projective Geometry : from foundations to applications, page 169, Cambridge University Press 
 Arthur Cayley (1873) "On the superlines of a quadric surface in five-dimensional space", Collected Mathematical Papers 9: 79–83.
 Felix Klein (1870) "Zur Theorie der Liniencomplexe des ersten und zweiten Grades", Mathematische Annalen 2: 198
 Oswald Veblen & John Wesley Young (1910) Projective Geometry, volume 1, Interpretation of line coordinates as point coordinates in S5, page 331, Ginn and Company.
 .

Projective geometry
Quadrics